The Cedar Tree was a television serial that ran from 1976 to 1979 on ITV in the United Kingdom.

It involved the story of the upper class Bourne family before the turn of the Second World War. The main setting is Larkfield Manor, the family home set in Herefordshire, in the grounds of which is the cedar tree.

The Cedar Tree was made by Associated Television Productions (ATV) and recorded at their studios at Elstree. Two established cast members were the veteran actress Joyce Carey and Susan Skipper, who played one of the Bourne family's daughters.
Two other noted actors involved were Philip Latham as Commander Bourne, and Cyril Luckham, as Charles Ashley, the benevolent grandfather. The first two series were shown on ITV in the afternoon in a thirty-minute twice weekly format, the final series was given an evening prime time slot and the episodes were extended to sixty minutes, and in a bizarre bit of casting Jack Watling who had been playing Captain Julian Palmer, an old friend of the Bourne family, in series 2, took over the role of Arthur Bourne in series 3.

In February 2013 it was announced that the first 1976 series was to be released on DVD. A complete box set of all three series has since been released.

Cast
 Joyce Carey – Lady Alice Bourne, widowed mother of Arthur and Phyllis 
 Philip Latham – Commander Arthur Bourne (series' 1 & 2)
 Susan Engel – Helen Bourne, Arthur's wife
 Sally Osborne – Elizabeth Bourne, eldest daughter of Arthur & Helen Bourne
 Jennifer Lonsdale – Anne Bourne, middle daughter of Arthur & Helen Bourne
 Susan Skipper – Victoria Bourne, youngest daughter of Arthur & Helen Bourne
 Kate Coleridge – Phyllis Bourne, Arthur's sister
 Cyril Luckham – Charles Ashley, father of Arthur's wife Helen
 Gary Raymond – Jack Poole
 Carol Royle – Laura Collins, friend of Victoria
 Jean Taylor Smith – Nanny
 Peter Hill – Gates, the Bourne's chauffeur and general help
 Ruth Holden – Mrs. Gates, the Bourne's housekeeper
 Shaun Scott – Jim Tapper, assistant to Gates
 Alan Browning series 1 & 2/Richard Thorp series 3 – Geoffrey Cartland
 Lillias Walker – Rosemary Cartland
 John Oxley – Peter Cartland
 Tom Chatto – Parsons, the Cartland's butler
 John Hug – Gwylym Meredith-Jones
 Joan Newell – Winifred Hedges
 Patrick Ryecart/Steven Pacey – Klaus Von Heynig
 Nigel Havers – Rex Burton-Smith
 Jack Watling – Captain Julian Palmer (series 2) / Commander Arthur Bourne (series 3)
 Rosemary Nicols – Angela Scott, magazine reporter
 Michael Macowan – Doctor Cropper 
 Pamela Mandell – Miss Pringle, owner of the Copper Kettle tearooms
 Richard Vernon – Lord Evelyn Forbes, old flame of Lady Alice Bourne
 Peter Egan – Ralph Marsh

References

1970s British drama television series
1976 British television series debuts
1979 British television series endings
British television soap operas
ITV soap operas
Television shows produced by Associated Television (ATV)
Television series by ITV Studios
English-language television shows
Television shows shot at ATV Elstree Studios